Holy Cross Monastery can refer to:
 Santa Cruz Monastery, Coimbra, Portugal
 Św. Krzyż Monastery, Łysa Góra, Poland
 Holy Cross Monastery (Wayne, West Virginia), USA
 Holy Cross Monastery (West Park, New York), USA
 Holy Cross Monastery and Chapel, Cincinnati, USA
 Holy Cross Orthodox Monastery (Castro Valley, California), USA
 Heiligenkreuz Abbey, Austria
 Monastery of the Cross, Jerusalem, Israel

See also
 Holy Cross Abbey (disambiguation)